Emma Katherine King Doyle is an American political advisor and former lobbyist who served as the White House Principal Deputy Chief of Staff in the administration of U.S. President Donald Trump.

Early life and education 
Doyle was born and raised in Pittsburgh, Pennsylvania. She earned a Bachelor of Arts and Master of Science degree in Finance, both from Georgetown University.

Career 
Prior to her appointment as Principal Deputy Chief of Staff, Doyle served as Chief of Staff to Mick Mulvaney when he was Director of the Office of Management and Budget. She previously served as Government Relations Manager for the Ford Motor Company, as a legislative assistant to Mulvaney when he was a Member of the House of Representatives, and as a legislative assistant to Senator Pat Toomey.

At a February 2020 meeting with President Trump and Mulvaney, Doyle objected to Trump's plan to appoint John McEntee as Director of Presidential Personnel. "Mr. President, I have never said no to anything you've asked me to do, but I am asking you to please reconsider this. I don't think it's a good idea," she said. Trump responded by screaming, "You people never fucking listen to me. You're going to fucking do what I tell you to do."

On April 20, 2020, it was announced that Doyle would leave her position as White House Deputy Chief of Staff to become the Deputy Chief of Staff for Policy in the Office of the First Lady.

Personal life 
In 2016, Doyle married Brett William Doyle, a former legislative assistant for Senator Pat Toomey. In 2020, Brett worked as the Senior Director for Congressional Affairs in the Office of the United States Trade Representative.

References

Ford executives
McDonough School of Business alumni
Living people
Trump administration personnel
White House Deputy Chiefs of Staff
Year of birth missing (living people)